Astara is an electoral district in the Gilan Province in Iran. This electoral district has 86,575 population and elects 1 member of parliament.

Elections

1st term 
MP in 1980 from the electorate of Astara. (1st) (Run-off)
 Mohammad Farzpour Machiani

2nd term 
MP in 1984 from the electorate of Astara. (2nd) (Run-off)
 Esmaeil Ahani

3rd term 
MP in 1988 from the electorate of Astara. (3rd)
 Mohammad Farzpour Machiani

4th term 
MP in 1992 from the electorate of Astara. (4th)
 Shapour Marhaba

5th term 
MP in 1997 from the electorate of Astara. (5th) (By-election)
 Shapour Marhaba

6th term 
MP in 2000 from the electorate of Astara. (6th)
 Hassan Zahmatkesh

7th term 
MP in 2004 from the electorate of Astara. (7th)
 Shapour Marhaba

8th term 
MP in 2008 from the electorate of Astara. (8th)
 Farhad Dalghpoush

9th term 
MP in 2012 from the electorate of Astara. (9th)
 Safar Naeimi

10th term 
MP in 2016 from the electorate of Astara. (10th)
 Vali Dadashi

References 

Astara, Iran

Electoral districts of Gilan Province